The 2011 Formula Renault 3.5 Series was the seventh season of the Renault–supported single–seater category. It was the final season for the current Dallara chassis with Renault Sport Technologies having confirmed a new car for the 2012 season.

After featuring 12 teams during the 2010 season, following the late withdrawal of SG Formula, the grid expanded to 13 teams in 2011 with the addition of leading Formula Abarth and Italian Formula Three outfit BVM–Target.

Regulation changes

Sporting
 The points system for the 2011 season changed to reflect the system used by the FIA for World championships. The top ten drivers in each race received points as follows: 25, 18, 15, 12, 10, 8, 6, 4, 2, and 1.

Teams and drivers
 = Series rookie for 2011

Driver changes
 Changed teams
 International DracoRacing driver Nathanaël Berthon moved to ISR.
 Daniil Move returned to P1 Motorsport after a season with Junior Lotus Racing.
 After finishing as runner–up in the 2010 season, Daniel Ricciardo joined Czech team ISR Racing.
 Having contested the last six races of the 2010 season with Tech 1 Racing, Jean-Éric Vergne moved to Carlin, having won the British F3 title with the team.
 For his second season in the series, Nelson Panciatici moved to KMP Racing from Junior Lotus Racing.
 After driving for P1 Motorsport in 2010, Jan Charouz joined the newly formed Gravity–Charouz Racing team. He was joined by Brendon Hartley, who raced for Tech 1 Racing and P1 Motorsport the previous season.
 Jake Rosenzweig moved from the Carlin team to Mofaz Racing for his second season in the series.
 BVM–Target signed Pons Racing driver Daniel Zampieri and FHV Interwetten.com driver Sergio Canamasas to drive in their début season in the series.
 Sten Pentus switched from Fortec Motorsport to EPIC Racing.

 Entering/Re–Entering FR3.5
 FIA Formula Two champion Dean Stoneman, who contested the final round of the 2010 season with Junior Lotus Racing, was set to compete with ISR Racing, but withdrew after being diagnosed with testicular cancer.
 Eurocup Formula Renault 2.0 champion Kevin Korjus and his Eurocup rival Arthur Pic moved into the series, competing for Tech 1 Racing.
 Italian Formula Three runner–up Stéphane Richelmi and 13th–placed Eurocup driver André Negrão joined International Draco Racing
 Alexander Rossi joined Fortec Motorsports, having competed in GP3 for ART Grand Prix as well as the –supporting round with ISR Racing in 2010. His teammate was Italian Formula Three champion César Ramos.
 Daniel McKenzie and Oliver Webb moved up to the series from British F3, and drove for Comtec Racing and Pons Racing respectively.
 After finishing ninth in Eurocup Formula Renault 2.0, Daniël de Jong graduated to the series with Comtec Racing.
 Robert Wickens returned to Carlin, after runner-up placings in Formula Two in 2009 and GP3 in 2010. Wickens finished 12th with Carlin in the 2008 season.
 Formula Renault UK runner–up Lewis Williamson contested the first round of the championship in Aragón for ISR, replacing Daniel Ricciardo due to his Formula One reserve driver duties in China.
 Chris van der Drift returned to Formula Renault 3.5 from Superleague Formula, and drove the first four meetings for Mofaz Racing. His budget ran out after Monaco and was replaced by Fairuz Fauzy.
 After missing the 2010 racing season, Dominic Storey drove for Pons Racing in Aragón. For the second round at Spa-Francorchamps, he was replaced by Indy Lights champion Jean-Karl Vernay. After Filip Salaquarda took the seat for the third round, Adrien Tambay drove in Monaco and GP2 racer Michael Herck drove for the team at the Nürburgring. Marcos Martínez, who won four races for the team in 2009 will compete at the Hungaroring.
 Former GP2 and A1 Grand Prix driver Adam Carroll replaced the injured Walter Grubmüller at the Hungaroring.

 Leaving FR3.5
 Reigning champion Mikhail Aleshin was due to graduate to the GP2 Series with the Carlin team, but had to withdraw from the series due to budgetary issues. He will instead compete in the German Formula Three Championship with STROMOS Artline.
 Stefano Coletti and Julián Leal also graduated to GP2, racing for Trident Racing and Rapax respectively.
 Filip Salaquarda, who drove for ISR Racing in 2010, moved to the Superleague Formula series. Prior to doing so, he contested the third event of Formula Renault 3.5 at Monza.
 After competing for KMP Racing in 2010, Víctor García switched to Indy Lights in the United States, driving for Team Moore Racing. Also moving to Indy Lights is Esteban Guerrieri, who competed for Sam Schmidt Motorsports having finished third for ISR Racing in 2010.
 Bruno Méndez returned to Formula Three in 2011, racing in the British championship for Hitech Racing.
 Greg Mansell moved into sportscar racing for 2011, joining the Lotus Italia Scuderia Giudici team in the inaugural Blancpain Endurance Series.
 After two seasons with Pons Racing, Federico Leo moved to the FIA GT3 Championship with AF Corse, sharing a Ferrari 458 with Francesco Castellacci.
 Jon Lancaster, who drove for Fortec Motorsport in 2010, joined the FIA Formula Two Championship.

Team changes
 Italian team BVM–Target joined the grid as the 13th team, taking the slot vacated by SG Formula before the start of the 2010 season.
 Gravity–Charouz Racing, with technical support from DAMS, took over the FHV Interwetten.com team's entry.
 After undergoing a restructuring process during the off–season, Epsilon Euskadi became known as EPIC Racing.

Race calendar and results
The calendar for the 2011 season was announced on 11 October 2010, the day after the end of the 2010 season.

Season results
 Points for both championships were awarded as follows:

Drivers' Championship

Teams' Championship

 Polesitter for each race in bold. No points are awarded.
 Driver who recorded fastest lap denoted in italics. No points are awarded.
 Driver who retired but was classified denoted by †.

References

External links
 Renault-Sport official website

Formula Renault 3.5
Formula Renault 3.5
World Series Formula V8 3.5 seasons
Renault 3.5